Imran Mohammadi (born 1 November 2001) is an Afghan cricketer. He made his Twenty20 debut for Amo Sharks in the 2017 Shpageeza Cricket League on 16 September 2017. He made his first-class debut for Band-e-Amir Region in the 2018 Ahmad Shah Abdali 4-day Tournament on 8 April 2018.

References

External links
 

2001 births
Living people
Afghan cricketers
Amo Sharks cricketers
Band-e-Amir Dragons cricketers
Place of birth missing (living people)